Nora Gulbrandsen (29 November 1894 – 14 February 1978) was a Norwegian porcelain designer and ceramic artist.

Biography
She was born in Kristiania (now Oslo), Norway to Aksel Julius Hanssen and Anna Sofie Lund. She was married to wholesaler Carl Ziegler Gulbrandsen (1892–1976) from 1917 to 1922. In 1943 she married engineer and genealogist Otto Delphin Amundsen.

She was educated at the Norwegian National Academy of Craft and Art Industry from 1923 to 1927. After graduating, she came to Porsgrunds Porselænsfabrik as a designer.
Gulbrandsen was artistical leader at Porsgrund from 1928 to 1946. Between 1928 and 1940 she designed several porcelain collections for the factory which were well received. From 1946 she was running a ceramics workshop in Oslo.

Gulbrandsen designed approximately 300 different designs and models during her time at Porsgrund.  She was inspired by Art Deco with cubistic forms and unorthodox color choices often contrasting bright to dark.
Porsgrunn City Museum (Porselensmuseet)  maintains a display of selected pieces of her work.

References

External links
Porselensmuseet website

1894 births
1974 deaths
Artists from Oslo
Oslo National Academy of the Arts alumni
Norwegian industrial designers
Norwegian ceramists
Norwegian women ceramists
Norwegian designers
20th-century ceramists